Jenseits von Gut und Böse (German: "Beyond good and evil") is the tenth studio album by German rapper Bushido. It was released as Standard, Limited and 3D Deluxe Edition on 13 May 2011 under his record label ersguterjunge.

The album reached Nr. 1 spot in the album charts of Germany, Austria and Switzerland. It sold 26,117 copies in Germany during the first week after the release.

Track listing 
 Information taken from Jenseits von Gut und Böse booklet:

The Premium edition features two added songs: "Unsterblich" and "Monopol".

The 3D deluxe edition features two added songs: "Das ist Business" and "Gestern war gestern", and contains a second disc, which features all instrumentals.

In addition to that an exclusive and limited Media Markt edition of the album exists with also 20 songs. In contrast to the 3D deluxe edition the songs "Das ist Business" and "Gestern war gestern" are missing. Therefore, this edition has two exclusive songs:

Samples
"Gesucht und gefunden" contains a sample of "Faces" (Ben Gold Vocal Mix) by Andy Moor & Ashley Wallbridge feat. Meighan Nealon

Charts

Weekly charts

Year-end charts

References 

Bushido (rapper) albums
2011 albums
Albums produced by DJ Premier
Albums produced by Benny Blanco
Albums produced by Swizz Beatz
German-language albums
Albums produced by AraabMuzik